Astou Ndour-Fall ( Ndour; born August 22, 1994) is a Spanish professional basketball player for the Chicago Sky of the Women's National Basketball Association (WNBA) and for Çukurova Basketbol of the Turkish Women's Basketball League. Born in Senegal, she represents Spain internationally.

Early life
Astou Ndour was born in Dakar, Senegal on August 8, 1994. Both of her parents had been basketball players. She was a stand-out basketball player at her school in Dakar. Ndour-Fall moved to Las Palmas, Canary Islands where she was adopted by the ex-coach Domingo Díaz and his wife, when she was 14. She continued to play basketball for her school's team in Las Palmas.

Career

Europe 
Ndour-Fall joined the youth system of Gran Canaria in 2009. She also played in the Junior Spanish Championship that year. Ndour-Fall became a naturalized Spanish citizen in 2011. She was a part of the Spanish youth team that won the silver medal at the 2011 FIBA Under-19 World Championship for Women where she nearly averaged a double-double. As a member of the Spanish Youth National Team, Ndour-Fall's teams always won a medal in each tournament she played, including the bronze medal at the Under-18 European Championship for Women.

Ndour-Fall started to play with the Spain women's national basketball team on 2014 when she was 20 years old, although she couldn't play the 2014 FIBA World Championship for Women, since Spain opted to take Sancho Lyttle, and FIBA Regulations establish that only one naturalized player per roster can participate in national teams competitions.

In 2015, she was part of the Spanish roster that won the bronze medal at the EuroBasket Women 2015 in Hungary and Romania. Ndour-Fall was acquired from the San Antonio Stars by the Chicago Sky in exchange for Clarissa Dos Santos in February 2017. In May 2017, Ndour-Fall was suspended by the Sky due to injury.

In 2018 she signed for Turkish team Çukurova Basketbol and in 2019 for Russian team Dynamo Kursk.

WNBA 
Ndour-Fall played for the San Antonio Stars in the 2014 and 2016 WNBA seasons. She was traded to the Chicago Sky in 2017, and played for that team in the 2018 and 2019 seasons. In 2019, she averaged 17.5 minutes and 6.8 points per game in the regular season and 25.5 minutes and 16.5 points in the playoffs as a starter. Ending the season as a restricted free agent, she was re-signed and traded to the Dallas Wings before the 2020 season. She was waived by the Wings after the season, and signed a one-year contract to return to the Sky.

Personal life

Ndour-Fall married Pape Fall in 2021.

Statistics

EuroLeague and EuroCup statistics

WNBA 

|-
| style='text-align:left;'|2014
| style='text-align:left;'|San Antonio
| 8 || 0 || 4.4 || .421 || .333 ||  || 1.1 || 0.0 || 0.0 || 0.3 || 0.4 || 2.1
|-
| style='text-align:left;'|2016
| style='text-align:left;'|San Antonio
| 30 || 9 || 14.9 || .396 || .344 || .829 || 3.2 || 0.4 || 0.4 || 0.9 || 0.5 || 6.0
|-
| style='text-align:left;'|2018
| style='text-align:left;'|Chicago
| 22 || 9 || 11.6 || .474 || .318 || .769 || 2.5 || 0.3 || 0.2 || 0.5 || 0.5 || 4.6
|-
| style='text-align:left;'|2019
| style='text-align:left;'|Chicago
| 21 || 11 || 17.5 || .492 || .424 || .722 || 4.2 || 0.7 || 0.5 || 0.7 || 0.7 || 6.8
|-
| style='text-align:left;'|2020
| style='text-align:left;'|Dallas
| 13 || 7 || 11.6 || .351 || .240 ||  || 2.9 || 0.5 || 0.2 || 0.5 || 0.5 || 3.5
|-
| style="text-align:left;background:#afe6ba;"|2021 
| style='text-align:left;'|Chicago
| 20 || 8 || 17.1 || .397 || .235 || .941 || 4.8 || 0.4 || 0.4 || 0.8 || 0.9 || 6.6
|-
| style='text-align:left;'|Career
| style='text-align:left;'|6 years, 3 teams
| 114 || 44 || 14.0 || .424 || .320 || .832 || 3.3 || 0.4 || 0.3 || 0.6 || 0.6 || 5.4

National team 
Ndour-Fall started playing with Spain's youth teams at 16, winning a total of four medals from 2011 to 2014. She made her debut with the senior team in 2014, when she was 20 years old. Up to 2021, she had 75 caps, with 13.1 PPP  and 7.2 RPP:

  2011 FIBA Under-19 World Championship (youth) 
  2011 FIBA Europe Under-18 Championship (youth)
  2013 FIBA Europe Under-20 Championship (youth)
 4th 2013 FIBA Under-19 World Championship (youth) 
  2014 FIBA Europe Under-20 Championship (youth)
  2015 Eurobasket
  2016 Summer Olympics
  2018 World Championship (All-Tournament Team)
  2019 Eurobasket (All-Tournament Team, MVP)
 7th 2021 Eurobasket
 6th 2020 Summer Olympics

References

External links
 
 
 Astou Ndour at FIBA Europe
 
 
 
 
 
 

1994 births
Living people
Basketball players from Dakar
Spanish women's basketball players
Senegalese women's basketball players
Basketball players at the 2016 Summer Olympics
Basketball players at the 2020 Summer Olympics
Centers (basketball)
Chicago Sky players
Dallas Wings players
Fenerbahçe women's basketball players
Medalists at the 2016 Summer Olympics
Naturalised citizens of Spain
Olympic basketball players of Spain
Olympic medalists in basketball
Olympic silver medalists for Spain
Power forwards (basketball)
San Antonio Stars draft picks
San Antonio Stars players
Senegalese emigrants to Spain
Spanish expatriate basketball people in Italy
Spanish expatriate basketball people in Turkey
Spanish expatriate basketball people in the United States
Spanish people of Senegalese descent
Spanish sportspeople of African descent
Spanish women's 3x3 basketball players
CB Islas Canarias players